Amélie Klopfenstein (born 18 September 2002) is a Swiss olympic alpine skier. She participated at the 2020 Winter Youth Olympics in the alpine skiing competition, being awarded the gold medal in the girls' Super-G event. Klopfenstein also participated in the girls' giant slalom event, being awarded the gold medal. She participated in the girls' combined event, being awarded the bronze medal.

Biography 
Amélie Klopfenstein grew up with three siblings in La Neuveville (German Neuenstadt). She skied her first ski race at the age of four. From the age of 10 she was enrolled in the Regional Performance Center Giron Jurassien and completed her compulsory education there. She then joined the National Performance Center West before transferring to the Spiritus Sanctus sports high school in Brig. There, Klopfenstein can focus on ski racing and her education (option "economics and law") at the same time.

References

External links 

2002 births
Living people
Place of birth missing (living people)
Alpine skiers at the 2020 Winter Youth Olympics
Medalists at the 2020 Winter Youth Olympics
Swiss female alpine skiers
21st-century Swiss women
Youth Olympic gold medalists for Switzerland
Youth Olympic bronze medalists for Switzerland